Guardians of the Galaxy: The Telltale Series is an episodic graphic adventure video game series developed and published by Telltale Games. Based on Marvel Comics' Guardians of the Galaxy comic book series, the game's first episode was released on April 18, 2017.

The plot centers on the Guardians' finding an artifact of great power called the "Eternity Forge" which each individually covets but must protect from the malicious Kree Hala the Accuser, who wants it for herself.

Gameplay
Guardians of the Galaxy plays similar to other Telltale games, in which the player's character talks to other characters, explores environments and interacts with objects within it, and at times, completes action sequences made up of quick time events. Players make choices, such as dialogue selection, that create determinants within the story affecting later actions within the episode and in future episodes. Within the series, the player primarily plays as Star-Lord, but may at times briefly take the role of another Guardian during action sequences, or, during specific times, play as another character in a flashback.

Development
Telltale and Marvel partnered to develop the game, quickly establishing that they wanted to make an original story that used the characters' canon but was not tied to the 2014 film. Telltale decided to go against an origin story, and instead focused on the connections between each of the five Guardians. Described by Marvel's Bil Rosemann: "A good Guardians story is about them as a family and showing how they're all misfits, they're all underdogs, they all feel like they don't have a family anymore" and coming together to form their own family that they depend on. Telltale saw this as well as elements from the established character histories to find "potentially surprising" elements to include, according to Telltale producer Justin Lambros. To achieve this, they planned each episode to center around each Guardian and explore their past, though the player will primarily remain in the role of Star-Lord throughout the series. This approach was novel for Telltale, since the character interactions the player opts for in earlier episodes can have a stronger impact on the later episodes, particularly in the relationship between the other Guardians. Telltale and Marvel's goal was to make the story accessible to people who may not have read through the comic series but had seen the film, while still dropping in hints and Easter eggs referring the Guardians' history in the comics to long-time fans.

Telltale's Guardians was first revealed during the December 2016 Game Awards, though rumors of the game had been previously found in material released by SAG-AFTRA actors as part of the 2016 video game voice actor strike in November. The game's first of five episodes was released on April 18, 2017; in additional to digital downloads, a retail version was available for the first episode release with an online pass to acquire the other episodes once released; it was released on May 2 in North America and May 5 in Europe.

Telltale hosted a panel about the game at the 2017 PAX East event in Boston, MA in March 2017, as well as having the first episode available for a "crowd play" session during the 2017 South by Southwest event.

Audio
The game is based on the Marvel Comic series and the recent film with an exclusive storyline. It has a different set of voice actors from the film. The cast includes Scott Porter as Star-Lord, Emily O'Brien as Gamora, Nolan North as Rocket Raccoon, Brandon Paul Eells as Drax the Destroyer, and Adam Harrington as Groot.

Plot
On the outskirts of an abandoned planet, the Guardians of the Galaxy, led by Peter Quill/Star-Lord (Scott Porter), receive a call from the Nova Corps asking for assistance in defeating Thanos (Jake Hart). They arrive at a Kree outpost where they find Thanos in the lower section of the building, the Nova Corps having been killed. Thanos discovers an artifact called the Eternity Forge and claims it for his own. The Guardians engage him in battle, ending with Peter killing him with a weapon created by Rocket (Nolan North). The Guardians celebrate at Knowhere, where several members of the team consider leaving.

The next morning, they wake up to find that they are in debt of a large bar tab, causing Peter to sell Thanos' body to either the Collector or the Nova Corps. Peter also considers handing over the Eternity Forge, but retains it after witnessing a flashback with his mother Meredith (Courtenay Taylor). After handing the body over, the Guardians are attacked by Kree forces led by Hala the Accuser (Faye Kingslee), who steals the Eternity Forge. Peter chases after her with either Drax (Brandon Paul Elis) or Gamora (Emily O'Brien) and learns that Hala intends to resurrect the bodies of thousands of Kree soldiers, including her son Bal-Dinn (Johnny Yong Bosch). Peter dies after being mortally wounded by Hala, only to be brought back to life by the Forge.

The Guardians seek the help of Yondu (Mark Barbolak), a former space-pirate who raised Peter after his mother's death, to repair the ship. Holding the Forge together, Peter and Yondu share a vision where Meredith tells Peter to find her whilst Ancient Kree appears on the Forge. While repairing the ship, Gamora suggests finding her adopted sister Nebula (Ashly Burch), who has knowledge on Ancient Kree and is currently attacking the chosen seller for Thanos' body. However, Rocket, now knowing about the Forge's resurrection powers, asks Peter to travel to Halfworld and resurrect his deceased friend, Lylla (Fryda Wolff). Regardless of Peter's choice, the group capture Nebula and discover they cannot resurrect Lylla.

Nebula provides them with the translation, leading the Guardians back to the temple where they discovered the Forge. Revisiting the site, they discover the location of "Meredith" is a planet called Emnios and that the Forge is only working at its minimum capacity. They enter the temple and discover the person sending the messages: Mantis (Sumalee Montano). An empath, she has been using Peter's memories to bring him to the temple and free her, so she could guide him on how he used the Eternity Forge. Mantis explains that the Forge has the powers to control life-energy, allowing the user to control death and resurrect anyone currently dead; however, a person has to die in order for it to revive someone as the Forge can only transfer life energy, not create it (revealing that when Thanos was killed, his life energy was transferred into the Forge, which revived Peter). Having been kept away by the Kree until a person called the "Celestial One", determined to be Peter, had discovered her, Mantis was tasked with leading the Celestial One to the means of either destroying the Forge or empowering it.

The Guardians, split on destroying or empowering the Forge, agree to let Mantis guide them to the final temple. While trying to resolve conflict within the group, Peter discovers that Nebula faked Gamora's death to avoid the wrath of their adopted father, Thanos, which resulted in the constant tension between the sisters. Peter then convinces the pair to either reconcile (which causes Nebula to join the Guardians) or part ways. Mantis guides the group to the temple, where Peter decides the Forge's fate. Afterwards, Hala and her forces arrive (thanks to a tracking device that was placed on the Milano) and attempt to retrieve it. Hala either resurrects Bal-Dinn with the empowered Forge, or absorbs its power when it is destroyed but is severely burned.

After being thrown to the lower levels of the temple by Hala, the team escape but are swallowed by a giant worm and trapped in the creature's stomach, where they have the option to adopt a younger worm that they find. If she joined the Guardians, Nebula dies of her injuries. The group are forced to use the engines of other ships and empty out the Milano to lighten the load and escape the creature, but it still pursues them. Peter is forced to either allow Drax to seemingly sacrifice himself and allow the others to escape, or refuse and cause Groot (Adam Harrington) to be severely injured in the process. This choice causes disarray and everyone except Peter and either Gamora or Rocket to leave the group.

After seeing the devastation they are partially responsible for, Peter decides to reunite the Guardians and defeat Hala. If Peter allowed Drax to sacrifice himself earlier, he finds him alive and rescues him. After convincing all members to rejoin, the team formulates an attack on Hala's ship to stop her from destroying Knowhere. After placing charges on the main cannons (as well as fighting Nebula if she was told to leave earlier), the Guardians battle and defeat Hala, who destroys the ship when she attempts to fire the cannons. Hala either is handed over to Bal-Dinn or the Nova Corps to stand trial, or dies from either Bal-Dinn killing her or the remnants of the Eternity Forge taking her life.

Having once again saved the galaxy, the Guardians celebrate having defeated Hala at the same bar; their tab having been muted for saving Knowhere. If the Eternity Forge was empowered, Peter can use it to resurrect one of the people who they have lost; either Drax's daughter Kamaria, Lylla, Meredith, or Nebula (if she died). If Peter decides not to use it, the Forge's energy dies. During the celebrations, the Guardians are once again contacted by the Nova Corps, asking for help with another situation.

In a post-credits scene, Thanos' corpse is retrieved by an unknown individual.

Episodes
The game was separated into five episodes for release on mobile devices, personal computers, and PlayStation4 and Xbox One consoles. The version of the series for the Nintendo Switch was announced in August 2017, however no release was reported.

Reception

Guardians of the Galaxy: The Telltale Series received generally mixed reviews from critics.

Episode 1: Tangled Up in Blue
Episode 1 received "mixed or average" reviews on all platforms according to the review aggregation website Metacritic.

Episode 2: Under Pressure
The Xbox One version of Episode 2 received "generally favorable reviews", while the PC and PlayStation4 versions received "mixed or average" reviews, according to Metacritic.

Episode 3: More Than a Feeling
Episode 3 received "mixed or average reviews" on all platforms according to Metacritic.

Episode 4: Who Needs You
Episode 4 received "mixed or average reviews" on all platforms according to Metacritic.

===Episode 5: Don't Stop Believin'''===Episode 5'' received "mixed or average" reviews on all platforms according to Metacritic.

Accolades
The game won the awards for "Performance in a Comedy, Lead" with Scott Porter, and for "Performance in a Comedy, Supporting" with Adam Harrington at the National Academy of Video Game Trade Reviewers Awards; in addition, it was nominated for "Excellence in Convergence" at the 2018 SXSW Gaming Awards.

References

External links
 

2017 video games
Android (operating system) games
Episodic video games
IOS games
Nintendo Switch games
PlayStation 4 games
PlayStation Network games
Point-and-click adventure games
Single-player video games
Telltale Games games
Video games about extraterrestrial life
Video games based on Guardians of the Galaxy
Video games developed in the United States
Video games scored by Jared Emerson-Johnson
Video games set in Colorado
Video games set on fictional planets
Windows games
Xbox One games